The UBC Thunderbirds football team represents the University of British Columbia athletics teams in U Sports and is based in Vancouver, British Columbia. The Thunderbirds program has won the CWUAA Hardy Trophy conference championship 16 times, which is third all-time among competing teams. On a national level, the team has won the Vanier Cup championship four times, in 1982, 1986, 1997 and, most recently, in 2015. The team has also lost twice in the title game, in 1978 and 1987. The Thunderbirds program has also yielded three Hec Crighton Trophy winners: Jordan Gagner in 1987, Mark Nohra in 1997, and, most recently, Billy Greene in 2011.

Recent history
Following four straight seasons of playoff drought from 2007 to 2010, UBC finished with a 6–2 record in 2011 earning second place in the Canada West with an appearance in the Hardy Cup. Quarterback Billy Greene would also become the third Thunderbird to win the Hec Crighton Award that year. However, all team accolades would be for naught as an ineligible student-athlete, who played in all eight games, would force UBC to forfeit all six regular season wins as well as its post-season results from that year. The school was fined and the program was placed on probation for the following season. This seemed to halt any progress that was made as the team finished 2–6 for the 2012 season and out of the playoffs for the fifth time in six years.

In 2013, the team bounced back with a 4–4 regular season record led by a solid defense and running back Brandon Deschamps, who was one of only three running backs in Canada to rush for more than 1,000 yards. They would lose in the Canada West semifinal to the eventual Mitchell Bowl champion Calgary Dinos 42–28. The program would regress again in 2014 as they finished with another 2–6 record and out of the playoffs.

During the following off-season in 2015, UBC Athletics would draw the Dinos head coach, Blake Nill away from the Calgary Dinos in what was the most high profile coaching change that year. Nill's impact was immediate as he was able to recruit quarterback Michael O'Connor, who was the ranked the sixth best quarterback by ESPN among the 2014 recruiting class. The Thunderbirds achieved a turnaround in Nill's debut season at the UBC helm to finish the 2015 regular season with a 6–2 record, placing second in the CWUAA standings. During the ensuing post-season drive of three straight single-elimination playoff games on the road, UBC upset the heavily favoured Calgary Dinos in the Hardy Cup game at Calgary; then defeated the St. Francis Xavier X-Men to earn its historical first Uteck Bowl victory at Antigonish, to advance to the national title game. In the 51st Vanier Cup championship, the Thunderbirds narrowly defeated the defending CIS champion Montreal Carabins, by scoring the game's last possession field goal to end the fourth quarter. The victory was UBC's fourth Vanier Cup overall, tying the Calgary Dinos for the all-time record among CWUAA member universities.

Rivalries
Competing against the cross-town Simon Fraser University, the Thunderbirds and Simon Fraser Clan previously shared a long-standing local rivalry, which had been dormant since 2010. That year, SFU left the CIS for the NCAA's Division II Great Northwest Athletic Conference. These two teams did not play within the same governing bodies until 2002 (SFU played, prior to then, in the NAIA while UBC has always competed in U Sports), they would compete in an annual match-up known as the Shrum Bowl, named after Gordon Shrum. After SFU's realignment to NCAA Division II was confirmed, it seemed as though the annual match-up would be decommissioned. However, the two teams went on to renew the Shrum Bowl game as a one-off exhibition on October 8, 2010 at Thunderbird Stadium playing Canadian rules. After years of conflicts in their respective competition schedules, the two teams are scheduled to play again in 2022.

Recent regular season results

A. In 2011, due to an administrative sanction, UBC retroactively forfeited its six regular season wins. UBC's ensuing post-season games were also removed from record by the Canada West Universities Athletic Association, citing UBC Athletics' submission of an erroneous eligibility declaration regarding one of its active roster players.

Awards and honours

National award winners
Hec Crighton Trophy: Jordan Gagner (1987), Mark Nohra (1997), Billy Greene (2011)
J. P. Metras Trophy: Tyson St. James (1999), Theo Benedet (2022)
Presidents' Trophy: Mike Emery (1981, 1982), Mark Norman (1986)
Peter Gorman Trophy: Glen Steele (1981)
Russ Jackson Award: Nathan Beveridge (2004)
Frank Tindall Trophy: Frank Smith (1978, 1987)

UBC Awards
Michael O'Connor 2016 UBC Thunderbirds Male Athlete of the Year Co-winner
2016 du Vivier UBC Team of the Year Award

UBC Hall of Fame
2016 inductee: Jordan Gagner, Quarterback
2021 inductee: Akbal Singh

Thunderbirds in the CFL

As of the end of the 2022 CFL season, seven Thunderbirds alumni were active in the Canadian Football League, having transitioned to professional football:
Diego Alatorre Montoya, Saskatchewan Roughriders
Nic Cross, Hamilton Tiger-Cats
Elliot Graham, Calgary Stampeders
Ben Hladik, BC Lions
Stavros Katsantonis, Hamilton Tiger-Cats
Michael O'Connor, BC Lions
Tom Schnitzler, Calgary Stampeders

As of the start of the 2022 NFL season, one former UBC player was on an NFL team's roster:
Dakoda Shepley, Dallas Cowboys

References

External links
 
 

 
U Sports football teams
Canadian football teams in Vancouver
1923 establishments in British Columbia
Sports clubs established in 1923